Let's Eat at Home is a cooking show hosted by Julia Vysotskaya. The series has been airing live on NTV and STB television channels since 2003.

Breakfast with Julia Vysotskaya
A spinoff titled Breakfast with Julia Vysotskaya aired on NTV channel from 2009 until 2016.

edimdoma.ru
In order to make it easier for people to share recipes, Julia developed the cooking social network edimdoma.ru in 2009.

The "Let's Eat at Home" book 
Julia Vysotskaya's first book of "Let's Eat at Home" recipes came out in December, 2005.
 2006 — "Let's Eat at Home. Recipes by Julia Vysotskaya"
 2007 — "Let's Eat at Home all Year Round"
 2007 — "Gloss"
 2008 — "Let's Eat at Home Every Day"
 2008 — "Tasty Notes"
 2009 — "I Eat, I Run, I Live"
 2010 — "Cooking for Kids of All Ages"
 2010 — "New Year Recipes"
 2011 — "One, Two and Ready"

"Let's Eat at Home!" DVD

 2007 - "Let's Eat at Home!"
 2009 – "The Party Starts in the Kitchen"
 2009 – "Picnics"
 2009 – "Happy New Year's!"

External links
 Julia Vysotskaya's "Let's Eat at Home" website/Culinary social network
 The shows "Let's Eat at Home" and "Breakfast with Julia Vysotskaya" on NTV
 Julia Vysotskaya's edimdoma.tv culinary television channel
 Julia Vysotskaya's video blog on the edimdoma.tv website
 Recipes from the programme at www.edimdoma.tv

NTV (Russia) original programming
2003 Russian television series debuts
2000s Russian television series
2010s Russian television series
Russian cooking television series